The year 1936 was marked by many events that left an imprint on the history of Soviet and Russian fine arts.

Events
 The first graduates of the Academy of Fine Arts after its reorganization in the Leningrad Institute of Painting, Sculpture, and Architecture under the All-Russian Academy of Arts.
 Retrospective Exhibition of works by Kuzma Petrov-Vodkin was opened in Moscow and in Leningrad.
 November 17 — The Autumn Exhibition of Leningrad artists was opened in Russian museum. The participants were Victor Oreshnikov, Alexander Samokhvalov, Samuil Nevelshtein, Nikolai Kostrov, and other important Leningrad artists.

Births
 March 7 — Tamara Polosatova, Russian Soviet painter.
 March 16 — Boris Kuznetsov, Russian Soviet painter.
 December 31 — Victor Korovin, Russian Soviet painter.

Deaths 
 February 23 — Sergey Chekhonin, Russian Soviet graphic artist (b. 1878)

See also

 List of Russian artists
 List of painters of Leningrad Union of Artists
 Saint Petersburg Union of Artists
 Russian culture
 1936 in the Soviet Union

References

Sources
 Выставка произведений К. С. Петрова-Водкина. Л., Искусство, 1936.
 Каталог первой выставки ленинградских художников. Л., Искусство, 1935.
 Artists of Peoples of the USSR. Biobibliography Dictionary. Vol. 1. Moscow, Iskusstvo, 1970.
 Artists of Peoples of the USSR. Biobibliography Dictionary. Vol. 2. Moscow, Iskusstvo, 1972.
 Directory of Members of Union of Artists of USSR. Volume 1,2. Moscow, Soviet Artist Edition, 1979.
 Directory of Members of the Leningrad branch of the Union of Artists of Russian Federation. Leningrad, Khudozhnik RSFSR, 1980.
 Artists of Peoples of the USSR. Biobibliography Dictionary. Vol. 4 Book 1. Moscow, Iskusstvo, 1983.
 Directory of Members of the Leningrad branch of the Union of Artists of Russian Federation. Leningrad, Khudozhnik RSFSR, 1987.
 Персональные и групповые выставки советских художников. 1917-1947 гг. М., Советский художник, 1989.
 Artists of peoples of the USSR. Biobibliography Dictionary. Vol. 4 Book 2. Saint Petersburg: Academic project humanitarian agency, 1995.
 Link of Times: 1932 – 1997. Artists – Members of Saint Petersburg Union of Artists of Russia. Exhibition catalogue. Saint Petersburg, Manezh Central Exhibition Hall, 1997.
 Matthew C. Bown. Dictionary of 20th Century Russian and Soviet Painters 1900-1980s. London, Izomar, 1998.
 Vern G. Swanson. Soviet Impressionism. – Woodbridge, England: Antique Collectors' Club, 2001.
 Sergei V. Ivanov. Unknown Socialist Realism. The Leningrad School. Saint-Petersburg, NP-Print Edition, 2007. , .
 Anniversary Directory graduates of Saint Petersburg State Academic Institute of Painting, Sculpture, and Architecture named after Ilya Repin, Russian Academy of Arts. 1915 – 2005. Saint Petersburg, Pervotsvet Publishing House, 2007.

Art
Soviet Union